Mollaşıxalı (also, Molla-Shikhaly and Mollashykhaly) is a village in the Qabala Rayon of Azerbaijan.  The village forms part of the municipality of Zalam.

References 

Populated places in Qabala District